David Limond Murdoch (2 November 1825 – 5 June 1911) was a notable New Zealand banker and company director. He was born in Ayr, Ayrshire, Scotland, on 2 November 1825.

References

1825 births
1911 deaths
New Zealand bankers
New Zealand businesspeople
People from Ayr
Scottish emigrants to New Zealand